Sir Edward Stanley Gotch Robinson, FBA (1887–1976), usually known as (Sir) Stanley Robinson, was a numismatist, specializing in Greek and Roman coins. He was Keeper of the Department of Coins and Medals at the British Museum.

Biography
Robinson studied at Clifton College, Bristol, and Christ Church, Oxford. He joined the British School in Athens, 1910–11, and then the Department of Coins and Medals at the British Museum in 1912. He enlisted in the army in 1914, but was wounded in combat in France, and, after a stint at the Home Office, returned to the British Museum, eventually becoming Deputy Keeper in 1936, and Keeper (Head) of the Department, 1949–52. He was then appointed Reader in Numismatics, at the University of Oxford, and advised art collector Calouste Gulbenkian on his numismatic collection which is now on display in the Calouste Gulbenkian Museum. He retired in 1955, but continued to advise in the Heberden Coin Room at the Ashmolean Museum, Oxford, to which he endowed his own collection in 1964. The ESG Robinson Trust continues to support numismatics.

He married Pamela Horsley in 1917.

Awards and honours
 1910 Winner of the Barclay Head Prize
 1955 Awarded an honorary doctorate from the University of Oxford
 1972 Robinson was knighted

Selected publications
 1911 "Inscriptions from Lycia", Journal of Hellenic Studies 34 (1914), pp. 1–35 (with H.A. Ormerod).
 1914 "Coins from Lycia and Pamphylia." Journal of Hellenic Studies 34 (1914), pp. 36–46.
 1915 "Quaestiones Cyrenaicae", Numismatic Chronicle, 4th series, no. 15 (1915), pp. 53–104, 137–178, 249–293.
 1920 "A find of coins of Sinope", Numismatic Chronicle, 4th series, no. 20 (1920), pp. 1–16.
 1927 Catalogue of the Greek coins of Cyrenaica (London: British Museum).
 1931 The Collection of Capt. E.G. Spencer-Churchill, M.C., of Northwick Park [and] The Salting Collection in the Victoria and Albert Museum (London: H. Milford, Oxford University Press).
 1931 Sylloge Nummorum Graecorum (British Academy).
 1933 (with Harold Mattingly) The Date of the Roman Denarius and Other Landmarks in Early Roman Coinage (London: H. Milford).
 1933 Lloyd, Albert Hugh. The Lloyd Collection (London: H. Milford, Oxford University Press).
 1936 (with John Allan and Harold Mattingly) Transactions of the International Numismatic Congress, Royal Numismatic Society.
 1936 The Newnham Davis Coins in the Wilson Collection of Classical and Eastern Antiquities, Marischal College, Aberdeen (London: H. Milford, Oxford University Press)
 1937 "A gold comb – or pin-head from Egypt", Journal of Hellenic Studies 57 (1937), p. 79. 
 1946 "Rhegion, Zankle-Messana and the Samians", Journal of Hellenic Studies 66 (1946), pp. 13–20.
 1951 "The coins from the Ephesian Artemision reconsidered", Journal of Hellenic Studies 71 (1951), pp. 156–67.
 1958 The Beginnings of Achaemenid Coinage, Numismatic Chronicle 18 (1958), pp. 187–93.
 1973 "A hoard of Greek coins from Southern Anatolia?", Revue numismatique, 6th series, no. 15 (1973), pp. 229–237.

For a complete list of publications, see "Bibliography of Stanley Robinson's works 1914–1966" in Colin M. Kraay and G. Kenneth Jenkins (eds), Essays in Greek Coinage Presented to Stanley Robinson (Oxford: Clarendon Press), 1968, pp. 259–263.

References

Further reading 
 C. H. V. Sutherland, "Edward Stanley Gotch Robinson, 1887–1976", Proceedings of the British Academy, vol. 63 (1977), pp. 423–440.

External links
 "Sir Edward Robinson Authority on Greek Coins." The Times (London). June 15, 1976; p. 16.
 E S G Robinson on Digital Library Numis
 E S G Robinson on Oxford Dictionary of National Biography (by Nicholas Mayhew)
 E S G Robinson in National Archives
 E S G Robinson in Dictionary of Art Historians

1887 births
1976 deaths
Employees of the British Museum
People associated with the Ashmolean Museum
British curators
English numismatists